Badljevina   is a village in the western Slavonia region of Croatia. The settlement is administered as a part of the City of Pakrac and the Požega-Slavonia County. According to the 2011 census it has 733 inhabitants. It is connected by the D5 state road.

Sources 

Populated places in Požega-Slavonia County